São Sebastião do Tocantins is the northernmost city in the state of Tocantins.

References 

Municipalities in Tocantins